The EURO Advanced Tutorials in Operational Research are a series of short books devoted to advanced topics in Operational Research that are not available in textbooks. The scope of a Tutorial is to provide more detail about advanced topics in a relevant field to researchers and practitioners. The Book Series was established in 2013 and is published by Springer Science+Business Media. It is an official publication of the Association of European Operational Research Societies.

 Renata Mansini, Włodzimierz Ogryczak, M. Grazia Speranza - Linear and Mixed Integer Programming for Portfolio Optimization
 Alves, C., Clautiaux, F., de Carvalho, J.V., Rietz, J. - Dual-Feasible Functions for Integer Programming and Combinatorial Optimization
 Henggeler Antunes, Carlos, João Alves, Maria, Clímaco, João - Multiobjective Linear and Integer Programming
 Lancia, Giuseppe, Serafini, Paolo - Compact Extended Linear Programming Models
 Duarte, Abraham, Laguna, Manuel, Marti, Rafael - Metaheuristics for Business Analytics
 Zhao, Lima, Huchzermeier, Arnd - Supply Chain Finance
 van Wageningen-Kessels, Femke - Traffic Flow Modelling
 Doumpos, M., Lemonakis, C., Niklis, D., Zopounidis, C. - Analytical Techniques in the Assessment of Credit Risk
 Bigi, G., Castellani, M., Pappalardo, M., Passacantando, M. - Nonlinear Programming Techniques for Equilibria
 Vansteenwegen, Pieter, Gunawan, Aldy - Orienteering Problems: Models and Algorithms for Vehicle Routing Problems with Profits
 Fajardo, M.D., Goberna, M.A., Rodríguez, M.M.L., Vicente-Pérez, J. - Even Convexity and Optimization
 Menoncin, Francesco - Risk Management for Pension Funds
 Brandimarte, Paolo - From Shortest Paths to Reinforcement Learning
 Maniezzo, Vittorio, Boschetti, Marco Antonio, Stützle, Thomas - Matheuristics
 Anjos, Miguel F., Vieira, Manuel V.C. - Facility layout. Mathematical optimization techniques and engineering (Review )

The editors are 
M. Grazia Speranza 
José Fernando Oliveira

References

External links 
 

Operations research